Tangara  is a large genus of birds of the tanager family. It includes 27 species. All are from the Neotropics, and while most are fairly widespread, some have  small distributions and are threatened. This genus includes some of the most spectacularly colored birds of the world.

Taxonomy and species list
The genus Tangara was introduced by the French zoologist Mathurin Jacques Brisson in 1760 with the paradise tanager (Tangara chilensis) as the type species. The name means "dancer" in the extinct Tupi language.

The genus formerly included additional species. A molecular phylogenetic study published in 2014 found that many of the members of Thraupis was embedded within Tangara. In the reorganization to create monophyletic genera, rather than merging Thraupis into Tangara to create an unusually large genus with around 58 species, taxonomists chose to split off species from Tangara into four other genera. Two of these genera were newly erected (Stilpnia, Poecilostreptus) and two were resurrected: they had been introduced earlier but were not in use (Ixothraupis, Chalcothraupis).

The genus now contains 28 species:

Distribution and habitat
These tanagers are mainly found high in forest canopies, but some occupy more open habitat. They are found at all elevations below tree line but are most diverse in the Andean subtropical and foothill forests of Colombia, Ecuador and Peru.

Behaviour and ecology

Breeding
The female builds a usually well concealed cup nest and lays two brown- or lilac-speckled white eggs. These hatch in 13–14 days and the chicks fledge in a further 15–16 days. The male and female feed the nestlings on insects and fruit, and may be assisted by helpers.

Food and feeding
Tangara tanagers pick insects from leaves, or sometimes in flight, but fruit is a major dietary item, accounting for 53-86% of food items in those species which have been studied.

References

Further reading
.
.
 Morton, Isler & Isler, Tanagers .
 Stiles and Skutch,  A guide to the birds of Costa Rica  .

External links

 
Bird genera